Wanton may refer to:
 Incontinence in philosophy
 Wanton (surname)
 Wanton, Florida, later renamed Micanopy

See also
Wonton